Echarte is a surname. Notable people with the surname include:

Jorge Luis Echarte (1891–1979), Cuban architect, engineer, diplomat, and politician
Ricardo Echarte (born 1974), Spanish judoka